The fourth and final season of the American television drama series Masters of Sex premiered on September 11, 2016, and concluded on November 13, 2016, consisting of 10 episodes. Showtime broadcast the fourth season on Sundays at 10:00 pm (ET) in the United States. On November 30, 2016, shortly after the season ended, Showtime announced that the series had been cancelled.

The series was developed for television by Michelle Ashford and is based on the biography Masters of Sex: The Life and Times of William Masters and Virginia Johnson, the Couple Who Taught America How to Love by Thomas Maier. Masters of Sex tells the story of Dr. William Masters (Michael Sheen) and Virginia Johnson (Lizzy Caplan), two pioneering researchers of human sexuality at Washington University in St. Louis, Missouri. The fourth season takes place in 1968 and 1969.

Cast

Main
 Michael Sheen as Dr. William Masters
 Lizzy Caplan as Virginia Johnson
 Caitlin FitzGerald as Libby Masters
 Annaleigh Ashford as Betty Dimello

Recurring

Guests
 Judy Greer as Alice Logan
 Andre Royo as Sammy Davis Jr.

Production
The series was renewed for a 12-episode fourth season on August 11, 2015, by Showtime; however, the episode count was later reduced to 10. In June 2016, production began in Los Angeles and several recurring roles for the season were announced, including Niecy Nash, Betty Gilpin, Erin Karpluk, Alysia Reiner, Jeremy Strong, Ashley Zukerman, and David Walton. In July 2016, it was announced that Andre Royo would be playing Sammy Davis Jr. and in August 2016, it was announced that Kelli O'Hara had been cast in a recurring role.

Episodes

Reception
The fourth season has received generally positive reviews from critics. It has a Metacritic score of 70 out of 100 based on 5 reviews.

References

External links
 

2016 American television seasons
Television series set in 1968
Television series set in 1969